Vacuum valve may refer to:

 Trickle valve, a type of airlock
 Vacuum breaker, an anti-siphon valve
 Vacuum delay valve, an automobile component
 Vacuum tube, an electron tube or thermionic valve
 Vacuum interrupter, an electrical device acting similar to a circuit breaker, used in higher voltage applications